2003 in philosophy

Events 
 Solomon Feferman was awarded the Rolf Schock Prize in Logic and Philosophy "for his works on the arithmetization of metamathematics, transfinite progressions of theories, and predicativity".

Publications 
 T. M. Scanlon, The Difficulty of Tolerance (2003)
 Gayatri Chakravorty Spivak, Death of a Discipline (2003)
 Terry Eagleton, After Theory (2003)
 Peter Gärdenfors, How Homo Became Sapiens (2003)
 Hannah Arendt, Responsibility and Judgment (published posthumously in 2003)

Deaths 
 February 20 - Maurice Blanchot (born 1907) 
 June 10 - Bernard Williams (born 1929)
 June 16 - Georg Henrik von Wright (born 1916)
 August 30 - Donald Davidson (born 1917) 
 September 25 - Edward Said (born 1935)

References 

Philosophy
21st-century philosophy
Philosophy by year